Falsoserixia is a genus of longhorn beetles of the subfamily Lamiinae, containing the following species:

 Falsoserixia fouqueti Pic, 1933
 Falsoserixia longior Pic, 1928
 Falsoserixia rubrithorax Pic, 1927
 Falsoserixia unicolor Pic, 1926

References

Desmiphorini